Attahasam is a 2004 Indian Tamil-language action thriller film written and directed by Saran, starring Ajith Kumar in dual lead roles. Pooja, Sujatha, Karunas and Ramesh Khanna play pivotal roles in the film, while the score and soundtrack are composed by Bharadwaj. The film released on 12 November 2004.

Plot 
The movie begins with Jeeva, a driving instructor, leading a happy life with his mother. He also fell in love with Swapna after several mishaps. Sujatha hides the truth from Jeeva that his father, was murdered by a dada named Manthiram. The mother, much against the boy’s wish, packs off Jeeva's twin brother, Guru  with a family who offer to adopt him, who had been witness to the murderer from a close quarter, to a distant town. He escapes from the family and goes to Thoothukudi and grows to become a gangster there.

When Jeeva visits Thoothukudi, he comes across his elder brother, Guru a.k.a. Thala. Seizing the opportunity, the elder brother kidnaps the younger one and decides to go as the driving instructor to Chennai. Initially, he plans to take revenge on his mother for packing him off from their house at a very young age. He hurts her at every step and even plans to sell off all their property.

On the other hand, Jeeva is mistaken as the gangster and is subject to attacks by the local gangsters of Thoothukudi. He escapes from them and returns to Chennai to save his mother. In the meantime, Jeeva learns of his father's death and Manthiram was the cause for the same. He avenges his father's death and leaves Jeeva with his mother to live happily and goes off to jail to keep his mother in belief that he is somewhere in the world living happily.

Cast 

 Ajith Kumar in dual role as:
 Guru (Thala), a gangster
 Jeeva, a driving instructor
 Pooja as Swapna, Jeeva's love interest
 Sujatha as Guru's and Jeeva's mother
 Nizhalgal Ravi as Guru's and Jeeva's father
 Babu Antony as Manthiram
 Mahadevan as Samutrakani
 Cochin Haneefa as Swapna's father
 Jasper as Fernandez
 Ramesh Khanna as Surula
 Karunas as Pangu
 Vaiyapuri as Kumbudren Saamy
 Manobala as Semi Joseph
 M. S. Bhaskar as Sex Doctor
 Crane Manohar as Driving School Staff
 Scissor Manohar
 Ilavarasu
 Sridhar
Ram and Lakshman as young Guru and Jeeva

Production 
Saran and Ajith Kumar collaborated for the third time after the successes of Kaadhal Mannan (1998) and Amarkalam (1999). Between then and 2004, the pair began shooting for another project for Poornachandra Rao titled Erumugam also starring Richa Pallod, before Ajith Kumar pulled out and the pair subsequently fell out. However Ajith Kumar's wife played a role in reconciling the pair and Saran worked on a fresh script for the actor. Kiran was initially roped in to play a second leading female role after her other film opposite Ajith Kumar, Mahaa, was shelved but Saran later deleted her character from the project. According to Saran in an interview, the story of the film was narrated to Vijay before Ajith. The filming was kept on hold for few months as Saran got an opportunity to direct Vasool Raja MBBS.

The shooting progressed in October 2004 around Tuticorin and a scene created a ruckus among the public as they mistook the action to be real, as the region had seen similar daylight murders and fights among local mafia in the past. Songs from the film were shot in Romania and Pollachi. The film released on Diwali 2004.

Soundtrack 

The music was composed by Bharadwaj and Released on Classic Audio.

Release and reception 
Despite a last minute financial crunch, Attahasam was released on 300 screens worldwide as Ajith agreed to pay a hefty amount to the producer for settling his liability to the financier. Oscar Ravichandran gave a significant amount to clear the producer’s debt in lieu of the satellite rights of the film, which in turn were sold to Jaya TV.

Visual Dasan of Kalki called Attahasam a dramatic breakthrough for Ajith. Malini Mannath wrote for Chennai Online, "‘Attagasam’ is a fun film, unpretentious and light-hearted, an enjoyable time-pass film."

References

External links 
 

2000s masala films
2000s Tamil-language films
2004 action films
2004 films
Films directed by Saran
Films scored by Bharadwaj (composer)
Films shot in Pollachi
Films shot in Thoothukudi
Indian action films
Twins in Indian films